The greater spotted eagle (Clanga clanga), also called the spotted eagle, is a large bird of prey. Like all eagles, it belongs to the family Accipitridae. Its feathered legs indicate that it is a member of the subfamily Aquilinae, also known as the "booted eagles." This species was once thought to be a member of the genus Aquila, but was reclassified to a distinct genus, Clanga, along with the other two species of spotted eagles. 

During the breeding season, greater spotted eagles are sparsely distributed across Eastern Europe, parts of Central Europe, central Russia, Central Asia, parts of China, the Indian Subcontinent and the upper Middle East. During winter, they migrate primarily to South Asia, Southeast Asia, the Middle East, the Mediterranean Basin and parts of East Africa. 

Greater spotted eagles favor wetter habitats than most booted eagles, preferring riparian zones as well as bogs, lakes, ponds, some coasts, and other bodies of water surrounded by woodland or forested land. Floodplains are the primary breeding sites, primarily ones that experience high water levels. During winter and migration they often seek out similar wetland habitats, but may appear in dry upland areas such as savanna plateaus.

The eagle is an opportunistic forager, especially during the winter, and will readily scavenge a variety of easy food sources, including carrion. Greater spotted eagles mainly eat small mammals, principally rodents, frogs, and a variety of birds, especially the vulnerable water birds. Reptiles and insects are eaten occasionally. This species rarely completely ceases hunting. 

Greater spotted eagles are primarily aerial foragers, gliding from concealed perches over marshes or wet fields to catch prey. This species builds stick nests in large trees, laying a clutch of one to three eggs. The female of a pair incubates and broods the young while the male hunts and delivers prey. Rarely is more than one fledgling produced. As is common among birds of prey, the oldest sibling is much larger than its younger sibling(s), whom it often attacks and kills. 

This species' range overlaps broadly with the closely related lesser spotted eagle (Clanga pomarina) and the two species are now known to hybridize frequently, to the detriment of populations of the rarer greater spotted eagles.  The greater spotted eagle is classified as a Vulnerable species by the IUCN. Its populations are threatened by habitat destruction, collisions with human-made objects, and hybridization with lesser spotted eagles.

Taxonomy and etymology

Greater spotted eagles are members of the subfamily Aquilinae, or the booted eagles, a monophyletic group within the larger Accipitridae family.  All booted eagles have feathers covering their legs. Members of this diverse, wide-ranging family may be found on every continent except Antarctica. Thirty-eight species of booted eagle are recognized. 

Booted eagles are often grouped with the genera Buteo and Haliaaetus, and other more heavy-set Accipitridae, but they may be more closely related to the more slender accipitrine hawks than previously believed. The greater spotted eagle's closest living relative is the lesser spotted eagle; they seem to have diverged from their most recent common ancestor around the middle Pliocene, perhaps 3.6 million years ago (mya). The "proto-spotted eagle" probably lived in the general region of Afghanistan, and split into northern and southern lineages when both glaciers and deserts advanced in Central Asia as the last ice age began. The northern lineage subsequently separated into the greater (eastern) and lesser (western) spotted eagle species of today, probably around the Pliocene-Pleistocene boundary almost 2 mya.

The spotted eagles were long classified as part of the genus Aquila, along with several other mostly large, brownish eagles. However, molecular phylogenetic studies using DNA sequences of one mitochondrial and two nuclear genes showed that the spotted eagles form a monophyletic group with each other and the long-crested eagle (Lophaetus occipitalis). Studies suggest that the spotted eagles should be grouped with Lophaetus or that all of these species should be grouped within Aquila. Furthermore, a close relationship has been found between the spotted eagles and the black eagle (Ictinaetus malaiensis) native to Asia. The spotted eagles, long-crested eagle and black eagle may comprise a species complex or clade. However, the spotted eagles were ultimately reclassified as a distinct genus, Clanga, due to overwhelming genetic evidence and large divergences in morphology and ecology between spotted eagles and their sister taxa. 

The extensive hybridization between the greater spotted eagle and the lesser spotted eagle may occur because, despite a significant genetic difference between the species, they have one of the closest relationships of any closely studied accipitrid taxa. The mitochondrial genetic sequences of these species have more than 3% divergence, about twice what is considered the minimum genetic difference to distinguish two species. A third spotted eagle, the Indian spotted eagle (Clanga hastata), was recognized as a distinct species from the similarly sized lesser spotted eagle in 2006. The scientific name clanga may derive from Ancient Greek κλαγγή, "scream," or its root may be the Greek word klangos (a variant form of plangos) for "a kind of eagle" mentioned by Aristotle.

Description

The greater spotted eagle is a rather large and compact eagle. Normally, it is black-brown with a contrasting yellow cere. This species has a short neck with a large, often rather shaggy-naped head, strong beak, and a short gape-line with round nostrils. The wings are broad and long, reaching the tail tip. The tail is relatively short and rounded. The overall effect of the broad wings and short tail can give them an almost vulture-like silhouette. The feet are large, and the feathers covering the legs are less compactly arranged than on lesser spotted eagles.  

Greater spotted eagles tend to perch in the open. Most perches are on treetops at a forest edge, or more isolated vantage point such as a bush, post, or a steep river bank. It is not uncommon for greater spotted eagles to forage from the ground or rest there in a somewhat hunched posture. 

Adult greater spotted eagles are generally a rather uniform dark brown to blackish brown, though the coloration may appear purplish and glossy, or appear more starkly contrasted, when freshly moulted. 

The upperwing coverts are often a shade paler than the rest, though these eagles generally appear uniformly dark with two contrasting features: a pale cere and a narrow white U above the tail, though this is usually concealed at rest. The species is dimorphic or even polymorphic, but pale and intermediate phenotypes are rare, although can be slightly more common farther east. 

As for pale adults (sometimes referred to as Clanga clanga fulvescens), the plumage is bicolored, with the tail, flight feathers, and greater wing coverts all blackish, but the body and the rest of the wing coverts appear light yellow or pale golden buff, and can become creamy when aged. The buff colour of the fulvescens phenotype is usually contrasted with diffuse dark colouring around the eyes, on the leading edges of wings, and more rarely and sparsely on the chest. Intermediate and other variants are very rare, but include those with a slightly paler body and variable yellowish-brown streaking or mottling on the fore upperwing coverts (which can make them look similar to juvenile lesser spotted eagles), or mottled yellow-brown with a dark-streaked breast and pale-tipped wing coverts (like the juvenile eastern imperial eagle (Aquila heliaca)). These intermediate types may show typical dark brown to black on the upper body, but in flight display pale mottled grey wing linings, or even normal coloration apart from the contrasting paler underbody.

The juvenile greater spotted eagle is generally uniformly black-brown with whitish to yellowish drop-shaped spots. Some juveniles appear very heavily spotted all over, others less so, but they always show an obvious row of spots along the upperwing coverts, forming clear wing bars tail and flight feathers, except the outer primaries. The feathers underneath on juveniles are often broadly cream tipped, often showing some buffy streaks below, especially on the flanks and trousers. In fulvescens type greater spotted eagles, juveniles are like the pale adult but show the typical heavily spotted wings and tail of typical juveniles and often show some darker centers to the scapulars and median coverts. By the 2nd-3rd year, the plumage is often considerably worn but white tips still create sufficiently prominent wing bars (unlike in lesser spotted eagles) until the 2nd winter, when most coverts are then newly moulted and with smaller pale tips. In subsequent immatures, from about the middle of 3rd year on, the plumage is more adult like with a few indistinct spots left or none, but remiges are of unequal age and untidy looking. The subadult is generally more uniform but often still shows some pale tips to the greater coverts. Maturity is obtained by about the fifth year, though sometimes they may not breed until the sixth. The bare parts change little in colour at different ages, with eyes being dark brown, while the cere and feet are yellow in all ages. This is a large, dark raptor in flight often looking bigger even than its true size, with well protruding head, quite long wings (which often look shorter due to their broadness), slightly bulging secondaries and rather squared seven-finger tips, although juveniles can look more rounded winged. On the wing, greater spotted eagles appear heavy bodied, which often is suspended below wings and relatively short broad tail. Comparatively, they tend to have quick wing beats with little upstroke and appear to have comparatively lighter flight actions than steppe eagles (Aquila nipalensis), but they appear somewhat more heavy, less graceful and less Buteo-like than lesser spotted eagles. Greater spotted eagles soar on almost flat wings, with hand often slightly lowered and the primaries well spread. When gliding, the wings are bowed with a clear angle between arms and hands, emphasizing the short look of wings.

On their upperwings, greater spotted eagles variably show a pale primary patch formed mainly by white based shafts and partially pale outer webs on all ages but these much smaller and less obvious on adults. The underwing almost invariably has a single white crescent formed by white base of outermost three primaries, secondaries and innermost primaries with nine to eleven dense narrow dark bars fading toward wing tips, these visibly only at close range. When seen in flight, the normal adult is uniformly blackish with a faint pale U above tail, barely paler wing coverts and paler quills. It is not unusual to have slightly paler wing linings (to contrary of literature) similar to lesser spotted eagles but only 1 not double whitish crescent at the base of primaries. In fulvescens/pale morph adults, most of the wing coverts on both surfaces and body are contrastingly buffy to tawny. Juveniles on the wing normally appear very dark with liberal spotting both above and below, though some juveniles appear with spots restricted to wings, scapulars and trousers. All juveniles when seen well always show the characteristic white end spots on wing coverts forming two to three wing bars. Otherwise, the juvenile has a creamy trailing edge to the wings and tail. Below juvenile greater spotted eagles have largely black (apart from the creamy crissum) wing linings contrasting with paler greyer-soot flight feathers. Other juvenile plumages are variably paler but with quills as those of a typical juvenile. The birds that breed in the Ural-Volga area are slightly larger and more muted in plumage characteristics and slightly smaller sizes in the species seem to be prevalent farther west, i.e. Europe; there appears to be a near 5% size difference in favor of Indian wintering birds over Middle East ones.

Size

The greater spotted eagle is a medium-sized eagle and a large raptor. Despite their similar plumages, this species shows strong sexual dimorphism in favour of the female. The size difference is up to 26% linearly and females not uncommonly can be as much as twice as heavy as the males, making them rival the martial eagle (Polemaetus bellicosus) as perhaps the most sexual dimorphic member of the Aquilinae on average. However, on the contrary, some of the largest male greater spotted eagles can overlap in most linear and mass measurements with smaller females. One sample of males averaged  and of females averaged . A sample of 3 males was found to average , a sample of 8 males to average , a sample of 4 to average  while an unknown sample size averaged . Four females were found to average , 8 to average , another 8 to average  and an unknown sample size averaged . In two samples males averaged  in wing chord while females averaged .

Vocalizations
The greater spotted eagle is quite noisy when breeding and is often very vocal too in winter, especially when in small loose flocks. The commonest call is often heard during inner or intra species conflicts and is a soft, one-syllable, penetrating, high-pitched, urgent whistle variously transcribed as kyack, kluh, tyuck or dyip. The call is not unlike that of lesser spotted eagles but is slightly deeper and more ringing. However, their calls are higher pitched than steppe eagles and much higher pitched than those of the eastern imperial eagles, the latter having a guttural call somewhat reminiscent of a big frog. Additionally, a not dissimilar agonistic three-syllable bark is seemingly used to warn off intruders at a feeding site, sometimes considered a harsh chrr-chrr-chaa-chaa, kyak-yak-yak and kyew-kyew-kyew. The cumulative effect of the repeated call is not unlike that of a "small hound" it is said. As with many raptors, the female’s tone is lower pitched and hoarser. One individual greater spotted eagle recorded over two days was found to utter an unusual ringing call that sounded remarkably similar to the first two syllables of the typical call of the crested serpent eagle (Spilornis cheela).

Identification

Despite a fairly unique appearance, field identification of greater spotted eagle can be quite difficult. Primarily this species is told from lesser spotted eagles by structure and proportions, though distant birds may be practically indistinguishable. The adult compared to the lesser appears very broad winged, which in turn makes the head look relatively small though it is important to remember that greater spotted juveniles can appear less bulky looking, narrower and more rounded along the wing and longer-tailed making their proportions closer to the lesser. Size can be clearly larger in the greater spotted eagle, with female greater spotted eagles effectively dwarfing most lesser spotted but there is a very broad size overlap between the two spotted eagle species, and in some cases male greater spotteds can be scarcely larger than even male lesser spotted eagles. Side-by-side, it is fairly conspicuous how much darker a pure greater spotted eagle typically is than a lesser spotted eagles. Greater spotted eagles, when compared to the lesser spotted eagles, are notable for their lack of nape patch, dark uppertail coverts, blackish-brown uniform arms, or uniform, dark upperwing coverts (not contrastingly rusty brownish). Some intermediates are difficult to tell from young lesser spotted eagles, but can be told by the greater spotted eagles intermediate’s usually darker wing linings, morphology, differences in appearance of primary patch and carpal arc. The juvenile usually lacks pale nape patch of the lesser spotted eagle, but it is sometimes present "albeit only slightly paler than rest of plumage and never ochre or orange". Typically the spotting and barring pattern is much stronger in juvenile greater than in lesser spotted eagles but this is not always reliable. Causing higher difficulty, the hybrids of the two spotted eagles often are often muddled and varied in appearance, some hybrids being much closer to one species or the other. Pure greater spotted eagles can be told from pure lesser spotted eagles via in hand measurements such as bill height, width and extent of white spots on the juvenile and the length of middle toe. The greater spotted eagle in the Indian subcontinent might be confused with Indian spotted eagles, more so greater spotteds in faded plumage. The Indian species is smaller (of a size or slighter even than the lesser spotted eagle), somewhat narrower-winged and longer-tailed than the present species, with primary fingers more deeply cut and square ended. The Indian species has a more distinct pale window in primaries, paler and less distinctly streaked underparts, and paler upperparts (more like a steppe eagle in colour) with less distinct, more diffuse pale tips to the larger wing-coverts. Furthermore, the Indian spotted eagle has a notably deeper gape extending behind its eye.

From non-spotted eagles of similar or of larger sizes, the greater spotted eagle tends to be fairly compact in features with proportionately broad (and short-looking) wings, a shortish tailed and an overall darker and distinct patterned plumage. One rather similar eagle is the steppe eagle which is larger and bulkier than the greater spotted eagle. Compared to the steppe eagle, the greater spotted eagle has a shorter neck, smaller bill with a shorter gape line, no pale nape patch (seen in adult steppe), narrower and less baggy trousers, and generally much shorter, slightly broader wings. At a distance they can look quite alike, but in favourable light you may look for the steppe eagle's bolder, more extensively barring on the greyer flight feathers, complete lack of carpal arcs below, paler throat and above paler nape and larger but more diffuse primary patch. Greater spotted eagles of the fulvescens and intermediate morphs resemble a large number of eagles, are separated by underwing colour and pattern such as their distinct carpal arc and thinly dark barred quills, from pale or intermediate morph of the similarly sized tawny eagle (Aquila rapax), which is usually less dark backed without the defused dark face and possessing more typical, less broad wing proportions. Juveniles of the eastern imperial eagle can resemble fulvescens greater spotted eagles but are larger and clearly structurally different. The imperial has much longer and narrower wings, a longer neck, a bigger, more prominent beak with an oblong (rather than oval) nail, a longer and narrower gape line, more conspicuous pale inner inner primaries, no carpal arc, a brown-streaked breast (though greater spotteds can show some diffuse marks), unmarked tarsal feathering, pale irides and obvious pale window on inner primaries. Against the paler morph greater spotted eagles, beyond structural dissimilarities, subadult steppe eagles can be told by the thicker well-spotted quill bars and paler underwing diagonal. In the eastern portion of range, can be told apart from the even darker black eagle via that eagle being much slimmer with paddle-shaped wings and long and clearly barred tail.

Distribution and habitat

Breeding range
This raptor is distributed primarily in the Palearctic and the Indomalayan regions. Its breeding range in Central Europe and most of Southeastern Europe is highly restricted today to small pockets such as far eastern Poland with isolated pockets spilling over seldom into western Belarus as well as in far southwestern Ukraine, far southwestern Romania perhaps spilling over into northeastern Serbia and probably formerly in eastern Hungary.  A more continuous breeding range begins in Eastern Europe including eastern Estonia, eastern Latvia, eastern Lithuania, Belarus from the central region broadly to the east and much of eastern Ukraine. A questionable number of breeding birds spill over into far eastern Finland. They are found quite broadly almost throughout European Russia where habitat is favorable up through much of Arkhangelsk Oblast to as far as the lower coasts of the White Sea. They are found across much of Central Russia, rarely far to the north, but can range to their probable northern limits as breeders in Shuryshkarsky and Pitkyarantsky. They are also found in a broad strip across southern Siberia reaching in Russia well into the Amur region. Their range out of Russia includes much of northern Kazakhstan with isolated breeding areas known in the East Kazakhstan Region and in southern Kazakhstan. Greater spotted eagles will also breed in a broad but generally isolated area from Kyrgyzstan and adjacent areas of Russia down to as far Xinjiang in China. Greater spotted eagles at times have been known to breed in the Indian subcontinent, reportedly Gujarat northwards to Punjab and even recorded breeding as far south as Saurashtra, (unsuccessfully) in Keoladeo National Park and as far as northern Maharashtra. However, this may have only been historically and almost certainly there is not a stable breeding population today. They are also distributed as breeders in northern Mongolia, rather far Northeastern China and northern North Korea.

Migratory range
Greater spotted eagles may disperse widely during migration, usually by about October (or sometimes September) on through November as well as February to April in spring, being found more broadly in distribution than during breeding or wintering. While migrating, greater spotted eagles may be seen in much of Eastern Europe, Anatolia and almost throughout the Middle East, Central Asia (from Kazakhstan south) and western South Asia. This species is prone to vagrancy, which has been reported in several countries in Europe including the Netherlands, Great Britain, Gibraltar and the Czech Republic. They are sometimes documented in central and east Afghanistan. Its regular breeding range no longer extends as far westwards as Germany but birds are still occasionally seen there with a few records per decade. Even young birds disperse widely; the Staatliches Museum für Tierkunde Dresden has a specimen (C 21845) shot in November 1914 near Bernsdorf in Saxony. It is a juvenile, and though its exact age cannot be determined it is heavily spotted and probably less than 20 months old. Additionally, vagrancy has been reported in several nations of Africa including Morocco, Algeria, Tunisia, Libya, Cameroon, Chad, Kenya, Tanzania, Zambia and Botswana. They also may distribute in East Asia across the southern part of the Russian Far East, eastern China and discontinuously in Southeast Asia from Myanmar and Thailand down through the Malay Peninsula. Occasionally, a greater spotted eagle may be documented even in Indonesia (i.e. Sumatra).

Wintering range
Dedicated wintering areas tend to be more limited and isolated than where the species is seen in migration. The central wintering areas for the species are principally the Mediterranean Basin, the Middle East and the Indomalayan realm. Small pockets may exist in southwestern Spain and bordering Portugal, South France, northeastern Italy, western Greece (where sometimes even considered the most common wintering eagle), small areas of southern Bulgaria, eastern Romania and southern Moldova. Other wintering areas including northeastern Egypt, southern Sudan and adjacent South Sudan, north-central Ethiopia, scattered areas of the Middle East including northern Israel, Kuwait and central Syria. More continuously they are found through much of the southern coastal Arabian Peninsula, including broadly along the Red Sea in Saudi Arabia coast as well as west and southern Yemen, southern Oman, coastal United Arab Emirates and eastern Saudi Arabia. Furthermore, they winter in southeastern Turkey, Azerbaijan, southeastern Georgia, rather eastern Iraq, broadly in western, northern and eastern Iran, southern Turkmenistan, western Afghanistan and far western Pakistan. They are also found discontinuously in eastern Pakistan, northern India, Bangladesh, southern Bhutan into northwestern Myanmar. In India, the winter range is through Indo-Gangetic Plain to Bihar, Jharkhand, West Bengal to Assam (including the North Cachar hills) and northeastern hill states extending south through central India. They were once reasonably common in the Malabar and Carnatic coasts but likely only back over a hundred years ago. After another gap, they are found in much of southern and central Myanmar, central and southern Thailand, southern Laos, the northern tip of Vietnam, discontinuously in southeastern Vietnam and much of Cambodia and southern coastal Malaysia. In China wintering greater spotted eagles range from Jiangsu and Anhui continuously down to northern Guangdong across to Taiwan, as well as seldom in Korea.

Habitat

The greater spotted eagle is found in open wet forests and forest edge, often adjoining marshy, swampy patches, bogs or wet meadows, as well as quite often river-valley woodland and floodplain forests. They generally show rather greater attachment to wetlands than lesser spotted eagle, even where there is more human activity but can be found in drier hillside forest in Central Asia. The differences in habitat preferences between the species was confirmed in northeastern Poland where the wooded areas nested in by the greater spotted eagles were in floodplains with considerably more annual flooding than those used by lesser spotted eagle. Although typically scarce while breeding in areas modified by heavy human development, they have been seen to hunt over cultivated land in Estonia and also it is seen migrating over lowland farms typically in the Czech Republic. Predominantly in Russia, it is found at the intersection points of taiga forest and open steppe often coincide around river valleys as well as pine forests, nearly dwarf forest, in wet, wooded areas of the steppe, and in forested swamps. In Kazakhstan, riparian forests in lowland steppes and forest-steppes mosaics are thought to be the primary habitat they use. In winter, much like during breeding, they usually occur in wetter habitats than most other eagles, including river deltas with some trees, mangroves, marshes, lakeshores and in India especially jheels. However, greater spotted eagles have been documented in semi-arid Acacia savanna in northeastern Africa. Reportedly in Eritrea, they occurred in open moorland, around villages and lowland grasslands while in Sudan were reportedly usually in shrubby areas. One seen wintering in Ankara in Turkey was in an upland forest area. In the Mediterranean Basin, a study found that the most preferred habitats by far of wintering greater spotted eagles were salt marshes and coastal lagoons with freshwater areas and upland areas much more supplemental. They are not uncommon in paddy fields and sometimes garbage dumps in Asia during winter, being much more adaptable to human-modified areas in this season, though by and large prefer assorted wetlands and mudflats, large rivers, estuaries and mangroves. In Arabia, they are largely found now in manmade habitats, such as sewage farms, reservoirs and irrigated cultivation since the native mangrove and Phragmites reed-beds that once lined the coastal bays and supported the greater spotted eagles was almost entirely eliminated (all habitats used by the late 2000s were created or altered subsequent to 1990). In southern Iran, they are usually found in mangrove areas. Key habitat in Iraq is the Mesopotamian Marshes. Wintering habitats in Israel are the wettest available valleys and damp open zones, chiefly cultivated fields and fish ponds near patches of trees, mainly Eucalyptus with similar habitats used in Oman. One greater spotted eagle was recorded on migration recorded to at least  in Ladakh in the Himalayas.

Migration

Greater spotted eagles are almost entirely migratory birds. However, it is not usually considered a long-distance migrant compared to other birds of prey. They commence movements by late August or any point in September, with peaks of migration usually falling some time in October. Autumn migration can last more erratically throughout November as well. The return spring flight is quite early, sometimes right around February, with a typical peak of March and into the end of April, seldom to early May. However, migration has been documented well into May, even late into the month, in Bosphorus in Turkey. Migration may peak earlier on average farther east, such as in Bhutan, where they often passing in largest numbers by late February. During migration, they migrate later (by around 2 weeks) than lesser spotted eagles and return earlier than that species as well, with far fewer numbers of the greater than the lesser spotted eagles at nearly all migration sites. Migratory greater spotted eagles breeding in Europe may move from short to long distances including to southern France, especially Camargue, some down to Spain, Italy and points eastward, sometimes also Sweden. Western breeding birds also regularly wind up in North Africa, with a few in Morocco, maybe Egypt, the Nile Valley and Sudan, some into Ethiopia and points south. Birds from various origin sites may wind up in the Middle East (mainly Arabia), South Asia (from Pakistan, most often Punjab  and Sind, mostly northern India and Nepal), east to Indochina, Malay Peninsula and south and east China. Predominantly, migrating greater spotted eagles on an East European track migrate to the Middle East or Northeast Africa, while other migrate through the Carpathian Mountains to the Balkan Peninsula and thirdly through Central Europe and Western Europe to Southwestern Europe. The main wintering sites of the Asian populations are located in the Arabian Peninsula, the Indian Subcontinent, the Indochina Peninsula and East China.

There’s limited information on discrepancies in how different ages and sexes migrate but in Malaysia, immatures outnumbered adults six to one. At Lake Baikal, 96% of migrating greater spotted eagles were observed to be adults, a concerning imbalance per researchers. It is said that lesser numbers are generally recorded in spring migration compared to autumn passage. Generally migrants of the species move on broad fronts in singles or pairs, large groups considered as up to 10 in northbound over Bhutan in late February. Greater spotted eagles tend to be scarce at traditional migratory bottlenecks such as Bosphorus  and the straits of the Red Sea. Old claims of as many as a thousand migrating eagles in the fall at Bosphorus are possibly erroneous (although there’s possibly been a reduction of up to 75% from what was once the peak migrating numbers). In South Baikal in Irkutsk Oblast within Russia, greater spotted eagles accounted for only 0.2% (7-34 individuals annually; 137 individuals over 8 years) of the observed migrating raptors in autumn migration. The largest (modern?) counts have been found to be 86 and 74 at Suez in Egypt in autumn and spring, respectively, with smaller numbers recorded crossing into Africa at Bab-el-Mandeb, although a maximum of 85 has been recorded in northern Israel in autumn. An adult captured near Mecca in western Saudi Arabia in late October was radiotracked  to Yemen, where it spent from late November-early February, before returning  via southern Iraq, across the Iranian highlands, skirting the south edge of the Aral Sea back finally to the Siberian breeding area near Omsk, covering  of return journey in less than a month. Satellite tracking has of an Estonian breeding bird confirmed it consistently used the same wintering ground in coastal Catalonia, eastern Spain, over 7 consecutive years. Despite some individual devotedness to wintering grounds, one radiotracked individual initially trapped in the United Arab Emirates was found to go to Pakistan instead the following winter from its Kazakh breeding grounds, showing some variability in this regard. The southernmost record of the greater spotted eagle ever was one that traveled  from the Polish Biebrza National Park to Zambia in southern Africa. Several other purportedly greater spotted eagles were tracked to several areas of Africa but nearly half were actually hybrids with lesser spotted eagles and were migrating in more typical fashion and location to that species. Improbably, at least seven records show immature greater spotted eagles staying through the summer in Saudi Arabia. Similarly, records show lingering numbers of this species in at least May in Peninsular Malaysia.

Dietary biology

This species hunts mainly on the wing, quartering over relatively open ground a bit like a harrier or soaring high above, dropping or diving steeply when prey is spotted. Brown & Amadon describe the hunting greater spotted eagle as "Although not a very active species it is not exactly sluggish, and on the wing it has the look of a true eagle". Greater spotted eagles will scatter waterfowl by stooping low over their flock, then selecting isolated individuals for attack. Sometimes the greater spotted eagle still-hunts from a perch, a method more commonly employed by other eagles of similar distribution, and often hunts on foot as well. It mostly takes prey on ground or on the water. Also some kleptoparasitic attacks are carried out on other birds of prey. Although scavenging for carrion seems to occur almost aseasonally, it is likely rather more prevalent during non-breeding times, with mostly fresh prey brought to greater spotted eagle nests. Greater spotted eagles are attracted often to grass fires and swarming locusts, often along with other predators such as steppe eagles, during non-breeding times. During the breeding season in Biebrza National Park in Poland, hunting behaviours were studied. It was found that the peak flying and hunting times were 10:00 AM to 2:00 PM, with the eagles rarely flying before 9:00 AM and often in repose from 2:00 to 4:00 PM. Prey deliveries may have been more varied when involving the male, the main food provider, than later into the season when the female resumed hunting. In Biebrza, hunting territories defended from conspecifics as well as lesser spotted eagles and other large birds of prey. Per the Biebrza data, the hunting success was 34% for the male up to mid-July after which success declined to 20%. The hunting success rates of greater spotted eagles seems to rather high, as aforementioned 34% for much of the breeding season, which is much higher at comparable times than golden eagles (Aquila chrysaetos), which has a hunting success rate of around 20%, lesser spotted eagles with a success rate of 24% and somewhat higher than Bonelli's eagles (Aquila fasciata), at a 28.5% hunting success rate. Pellets are considered the most reliable way to determine greater spotted eagle foods as prey remains alone can be biased towards birds.

The greater spotted eagle is a slightly opportunistic predator but tends to favor rather particular prey types. The diet tends to be composed mostly of small mammals. There is some dietary similarity to the better-known lesser spotted eagle but the greater spotted includes more birds in foods and favors larger prey. Beyond mammals and birds, the greater spotted eagle will sometimes prey on amphibians, reptiles (mainly small-to-mid-sized snakes) and occasionally small fish and insects. As can be expected by their habitat preferences, they tend to focus on vertebrates that are associated with water. Generally its prey spectrum is somewhat diverse, at slightly fewer than 150 known prey species, more diverse than the known diet of steppe eagles, similar in diversity to that of the lesser spotted eagle but possibly about half as diverse of the diet of the eastern imperial eagle. It is sometimes stated that they tend to take prey mostly up to only . This was backed this up via estimations from another source that around 22% of the diet will weigh  or less, 37% of diet will weigh  and around 30% will weigh  and that generally most prey will weigh under . The mean estimated size of male prey deliveries in an Estonian study was merely . The mean prey sizes are roughly similar to those of larger steppe eagles and somewhat higher than those of lesser spotted eagles, which tended to heavily focus on prey weighing under  weight range of prey (around 60% of diet), however most Aquila eagles tended to take prey typically that were slightly to considerably higher in weight than the prey typical of greater spotted eagles. However, sometimes the greater spotted eagle is credited with successful attacks on large prey.

In the largest known food study for greater spotted eagle the diet was studied in 3 different habitats in Belarusian Polesia, from natural to mixed to modified habitats. 797 prey items were identified total, but often not to species. Many, surprisingly, were unidentified invertebrates which made up 15.8%, with beetles (also unidentified to species) being a further 14.9%. Assorted Microtus voles were important in Polesia, namely  the common (Microtus arvalis), tundra (Microtus oeconomus) and East European voles (Microtus mystacinus) made up collectively 23.4% of the diet by number. Other significant prey were European water vole (Arvicola terrestris) at 8.9%, common snipe (Gallinago gallinago) at 4.1%, mallard (Anas platyrhynchos) at 3.3%, water rail (Rallus aquaticus) 3.1%, unidentified small passerines 2.9%, spotted crakes (Porzana porzana) 2.6% and grass snakes (Natrix natrix) 2.3%. Significant in biomass but less so to numbers were the northern white-breasted hedgehog (Erinaceus roumanicus), European mole (Talpa europaea), Anas dabbling ducks, grey herons (Ardea cinerea), Eurasian bitterns (Botaurus stellaris) and black grouse (Lyrurus tetrix), with very small numbers of very large birds being taken. Bird prey in Polesia made up 68% of the diet, mammals 25.3%, reptiles 3.4%, fish 3% and amphibians 0.3%. Of 102 prey items in the Belarusian Smolenskoye Poozerye National Park, 38.2% were European water voles, 7.8% were European moles, 5.9% each Sorex shrews, Microtus voles, and unidentified passerine species and 8.7% were common frogs. At a nest in Estonia, of 105 visually identified prey items, Microtus species and further unidentified rodents comprised some 63% by number, however they made up only 28% by biomass, while birds formed only 19% numerically but 56% of biomass.45% of avian prey species were medium-sized, e.g. hazel grouse (Bonasa bonasia), grey partridge (Perdix perdix), northern lapwing (Vanellus vanellus) and hooded crow (Corvus cornix). Other European studies have been largely confined to wintering greater spotted eagles. In the Amvrakikos Wetlands of Greece, 95 prey items were determined, being composed almost exclusively of water birds. The main prey here were common teal (Anas crecca) (17.9% by number, 15.9% by biomass), common moorhen (Gallinula chloropus) (16.8% by number, 14.9% by biomass), Eurasian wigeon (Anas penelope ) (11.6% in number, 27.4% in biomass), unidentified Anas ducks (5.3%, 7.8% in biomass), Eurasian coot (Fulica atra) (4.2% by number, 8.7% by biomass) and little egret (Egretta garzetta) (3.2% by number, 4.7% biomass), with a smallish contribution by ground beetles, passerines and snakes. Over 8 years of study in Natural Park of El Fondo in the Spanish Province of Alicante almost entirely large prey was taken here, i.e. few to none small rodents such as voles. Among the 100 prey items found, the main prey were common moorhen (23.1% by number, 15.2% in biomass), common teal (8.97% by number, 6.44% by biomass) and black rat (Rattus rattus) (7.69% by number, 3.01% by biomass), with unidentified Rattus making up 7.69%  by number, 2.76% by biomass. Other notable regular prey here were black-headed gull (Chroicocephalus ridibundus), Eurasian coots and northern lapwing (Vanellus vanellus), while large prey, making up much of the biomass were common carp (Cyprinus carpio) at 18.9% of biomass, grey heron at 11.7% of biomass and European rabbit (Oryctolagus cuniculus) at 9% of the biomass.

In nests in Western Russia, a mean total of 53% of the diet was small mammals and 45% was birds. The diet upon study in the Leningrad region was led by European water vole at nearly 51% of 79 prey items followed by introduced muskrats (Ondatra zibethicus) at 13.9% of diet and common teal 3.8% of diet, with 20.2% of diet made up of by frogs, most probably common (Rana arvalis) but also some moor frogs (Rana temporaria). 322 non-carrion prey items were found for greater spotted eagles in the Belaya River, 59% of which were mammals. The diet was largely European water vole at 32.6%, followed by smaller voles and mice. It was found that the Belaya eagles ate a large balances of reptile prey, which were found to comprise 19.5% of the diet. 15% of all vertebrate prey, in fact, was European adders (Vipera berus), adders and grass snakes being the primary reptile prey. The eagles in Belaya are often seen grasping snakes about the head. In Belaya, only 6.5% of the diet was birds and they were mainly significant only in the Oka Nature Reserve and the eagles of the region occasionally partook in carrion feeding, including moose (Alces alces) carcasses. In a compilation study from the Volga region, Ural Mountains and Western Siberia, 74.7% of the diet was mammalian in 482 prey items in the regions. The main prey species was the European water vole at an average of 32.4% of diet (28.1-36.8%), followed by common vole at avg 11.4% (0-17%), tundra vole at 6.2% (1.9-16.9%), birds comprised about 16% of diet, most importantly Eurasian coots and Podiceps grebes, followed by rooks (Corvus frugilegus). In the Tyva Republic, more terrestrial, upland hunting can be projected since the Daurian pika (Ochotona dauurica) was reportedly the main prey for greater spotted eagles. Similarly, in Khakassia, the greater spotted eagle were said to hunt mostly the long-tailed ground squirrel (Spermophilus undulatus), the only area known where ground squirrels were said to be preferred over voles in breeding areas for these eagles.

The diet is generally more erratically known in non-European wintering areas, while, like many other raptors of similar region, migrating greater spotted eagles typically fast until they reach their wintering terminus point. The most well-studied Asian wintering population of the species in terms of dietary behaviour is likely in Bharatpur in India, particularly in Keoladeo National Park. It was found that the greater spotted eagles here occupied a greater range of habitat than other spotted and Aquila eagle. Winter numbers are up to 30 for this species, with them recorded to exploit the full  length of the local marshland, their numbers peaking in November and December and then diminishing after January. Here greater spotted eagles are non-territorial and free ranging. Like most other wintering migrant raptors here, the greater spotted eagle becomes a highly opportunistic feeder that shows a preference for easily attainable foods, akin to the milvine kites they often overlap with in the winter quarters. The greater spotted eagles regularly come down to carrion, pirate food from other birds, feed on stranded fish and, perhaps most regularly, hunting and taking young herons, storks and other water birds from heronries. When regularly hunting around them, the greater spotted eagles often approach the heronry in a hover, creating tumult throughout the heronry, as the heronry settles they often suddenly drop onto singled out nest, the eagle defeathers the squab (nestling water bird) on the nest itself and commences feeding. The Bharatpur greater spotted eagles tend to shows a slight preference for slow moving prey, but also takes fast flying birds like waders and ducks and often tests flocks of coots with low flights over water and continually "buzzing" the birds until an opportunity presents itself via an individual isolated. Often perches extensively on a favorite lookout post with Acacia nilotica favored in Bharatpur. Some possible nighttime hunting has been inferred for greater spotteds in Bharatpur but they typically hunt by day. During inclement weather in Bharatpur, the eagles may pause hunting. As many as 7-10 greater spotted eagles are attracted by a conspecific’s heronry kill and subsequently often jostle each other. Often this results in the eagle’s accidentally drop the kill into the water, though those dropped onto dry ground frequently become food for wild boars (Sus scrofa) and golden jackals (Canis aureus). In one case, two adult greater spotted eagles and a single immature eastern imperial eagle destroyed at least 30 water bird nests in a single day. Out of 79 hours of observation on greater spotted eagles, 49% of the time was spent foraging, increasing to 72% by March due to scarcer foods. Meanwhile, they spent 26.4% of observed time resting and 20.6% of the time soaring, with soaring rising to 35% in February. In the general Indian subcontinent, greater spotted eagles are known to freely scavenge carrion, as well as to feed on small wetland dwellers such as frogs, especially Indus valley bullfrogs (Hoplobatrachus tigerinus), and chameleons and Calotes lizards on land nearby. A general aptitude in the region has been reported for avian prey, largely larger rails such as moorhens, Eurasian coots and gray-headed swamphens (Porphyrio poliocephalus), as well as waterfowl and (mostly young) storks, herons and egrets; however upland birds such as rufous treepies (Dendrocitta vagabunda), Eurasian collared doves (Streptopelia decaocto) and Indian rollers (Coracias benghalensis) seem to be in the spectrum there too. Though rare at large carrion, greater spotted eagles in the Indian subcontinent seem to be attracted to terrapins maimed or partially eaten by Pallas's fish eagles (Haliaeetus leucoryphus), Egyptian (Neophron percnopterus) and red-headed vultures (Sarcogyps calvus). The Indian wintering eagles do not appear to shun hunting terrestrial creatures and have been seen to hunting also snakes, rodents and other small mammals in the region.

Ancedotal evidence of the diet of wintering greater spotted eagles was attained in the central plains of Thailand. Here they were seen to eat dead fish in drained ponds as well as to actively hunt and to pirate food from other raptors. They were seen to prey on domestic ducks (Anas platyrhynchos domesticus) that became separated from their large farm flocks as well as to feed on dead lesser whistling ducks (Dendrocygna javanica) found to be killed by poisons meant to kill off snails. One farther prey species reported to be likely highly important to this region’s greater spotted eagles is the ricefield rat (Rattus argentiventer). Despite not being an eagle considered to show an aptitude for attacking large or varied prey, sometimes greater spotted eagles seem to be capable of taking very varied and sometimes substantially sized prey. It has been detected that small invertebrates may be taken at times, including ground beetles, locusts and non-native red swamp crayfish (Procambarus clarkii). The greater spotted eagle takes a range of birds ranging down to the size of the  common reed bunting (Emberiza schoeniclus). They can take fairly large water birds up to the size of grey herons, mallards, fledgling painted storks (Mycteria leucocephala), Asian openbills and greater white-fronted geese (Anser albifrons) as well as some cormorants and flamingoes. Sometimes the greater spotted eagle will attack or feed on cranes, although they not infrequently scavenge these as well. Many attacks attempted against cranes are reportedly unsuccessful against these tough prey. Likely cases of predation on adult common cranes (Grus grus) have been reported while one a demoiselle crane (Grus virgo) was unsuccessful while they were considered a potential threat possibly to the young of red-crowned cranes (Grus japonica). Sometimes greater spotted eagles may prey upon around a half dozen species of mustelid mostly assorted weasels and stoats but also including larger species such as minks and martens.

Interspecific predatory relationships

Greater spotted eagles often overlap broadly with a number of similar eagle species in both its breeding and wintering haunts. Although they are most obviously similar in dietary biology to the lesser spotted eagles, in the larger portion of their breeding range, the greater spotted eagles are allopatric from the lesser spotted. Where they do overlap, the greater spotted eagle has a somewhat similar diet to that of the lesser spotted eagles but tends to focus more so water-friendly species and to take relatively more birds, whereas the lesser spotted eagle often focuses variously on voles, small snakes such as grass snakes and frogs. Expectedly from its prey, the lesser spotted eagle tends to nest in slightly drier environments, usually somewhat away from wetlands and floodplains, adapting rather more readily to patchwork areas where human development has occurred. More similar in central distribution are larger eagles such as the eastern imperial eagle and steppe eagle. Furthermore, these species undertake roughly similar migratory routes, though the steppe is clearly the most populous and regular migrant (in spite of its extreme decline), appearing in numbers from Africa to South Asia, while the greater spotted and eastern imperial eagles are regular to as far west as the Middle East and appear scarcely to rarely in Africa. The greater spotted eagles is clearly partitioned, however, from the other eagles in its favoring of wet and partial wooded habitats and liking for animals that dwell in them as prey. The eastern imperial eagle also nests in woods but usually in rather upland areas and favors both social and solitary terrestrial mammals and birds, including hares, hamsters, ground squirrels and hedgehogs as well as pheasants, corvids and other mid-sized birds.  Meanwhile, the steppe eagle favours typically rather dry and very open habitats in the steppe, usually nesting on a rise or outcrop in the flat, sparse habitat, and much favours ground squirrels, supplemented by other rather small terrestrial species such as pikas, voles and zokors. Usually habitat keeps these eagles rather separated from the greater spotted eagle while nesting, however in some winter quarters such as India, the Mediterranean Basin and the Middle East, considerable convergence occurs. All three eagles are well established to be rather unpicky opportunists and scavengers during winter, freely coming to human refuse, though favoring livestock carcass dumps, scavenging unclaimed carrion, robbing other birds of prey of their catches, killing the young of prey such as water birds, finding insect swarms or emergences (though more so the steppe than the others) and following grass fires. Of these three, the steppe tends to be least actively predatory in winter typically, the imperial the most likely to continue to live-hunt (and perch most extensively) and the greater spotted eagle somewhere in the intermediate behavioral zone. The greater spotted is the least likely of the three to visit carrion or carcass dumps but in the Indian subcontinent, they all heavily share food sources such as nestling water birds. When conflicts arise, the body size of eagle imparts its position in the hierarchy, with the eastern imperial eagle dominant, followed by the steppe eagle while the greater spotted eagle is somewhat subservient to both. The three eagles were well studied in Bharatpur, where they competed against the shorter distance migrant, the Pallas's fish eagle, which vied with the imperial eagles for the dominant raptor position while all the larger eagles dominated the smaller competing resident Indian spotted eagles. A non-eagle raptor often associated with wintering greater spotted eagles, attracted to similar feeding opportunities, is the black kite (Milvus migrans).

While scavenging, the greater spotted eagles tend not to come to carrion if Old World vultures are present. The greater spotted eagles is an accomplished pirate during the winter season. They often rob a variety of other raptors including black kites (Milvus migrans), ospreys (Pandion haliaetus), western (Circus aeruginosus) and eastern marsh harriers (Circus spilonotus) and even other eagles including larger species like white-bellied sea eagles (Haliaeetus leucogaster) and steppe eagles. Despite their typically inferior position to them, the greater spotted eagle was observed to often successfully displaced the steppe eagle in Bharatpur from disputed food, with the steppes being more tractable when gorged. They tend to rob the other raptor aerially when the victim is trying to take initial flight with the prey, taking advantage of the other bird’s attempt to balance itself, during which they yank away the prey and escape fairly rapidly. More infrequently, greater spotted eagles will exploit other raptors as prey. Some species they been known to prey have including black kites, booted eagles (Hieraeetus pennatus), western marsh harriers and common buzzards (Buteo buteo) as well as some owls like long-eared (Asio otus) and short-eared owls (Asio flammeus). Additionally, they were considered a potential predator of small nestlings of the Eurasian griffon (Gyps fulvus). The greater spotted eagles themselves have few well documented predators. While this is probably due in part to scant research, usually as a quite large and powerful bird of prey, it usually fulfills the role of an apex predator. However, one well documented predator of likely any aged greater spotted eagles is the Eurasian eagle owl (Bubo bubo). Furthermore, European pine martens are known to feed on nestlings of greater spotted eagles.

Breeding
Often the greater spotted eagle occurs in pairs or solitary, but in winter sometimes occurs in small to large flocks, especially around attractive food source. The species is often seen singly seen in migration, though sometimes in twos or threes or more. The display of this eagle on territory is not well known but includes single or mutual high circling, soaring high and the male diving down on half-closed wings towards the female, all with much calling. The highest density though was in Volga-Ural area, with up to 3.58-17.01 pairs where the locally preferred habitat (flooded alders) was available. In the Ishim River basin of Kazakhstan there are about 0.54 pairs per , while in the Kazakh Irtysh pine forests there was a density of 1.08 pairs per  in internal edges of pine forests and a much higher density of 13.23 pairs per  of edges of forests along lakes and bogs in the Irtysh basin. However, the possible highest density of pairs in Kazakhstan is possibly the region of the Ishim River, holding perhaps 39% of the nation’s breeding pairs. Furthermore, in well suited Russian habitats, nests were said (at least historically) to be found every  of riverside, with fairly consistent pair reuse in following years. This species breeds from late April to August in much of its range. However, when breeding in Pakistan and elsewhere in the Indian subcontinent, they may do so in different reports from November to March, sometimes further into June to July, indicating an inconsistent nesting schedule there.

Nests
The nests built by this species tend to have some particular features. Namely, the species tends to utilize fresh branches with foliage or green needles (where nesting in conifer predominated forests) still attached for their nest sticks (most other acciptrids prefer sparse or leafless branches while building nests). Nests are lined with green leaves, pine needles and grass, as is common in accipitrids, and they may be added continuously throughout the breeding cycle. The nest is normally located in a tree usually in the main fork, a large lateral branch or even the top of typically large broadleaf trees just inside forests. Russian compilation studies reflect that about 68.7% of found greater spotted eagle nests were on deciduous trees with the remaining balance in coniferous trees. In the Russian Nizhny Novgorod region nests were typically located on birches (10 out of 11 that were found) and one on a black alder (Alnus glutinosa). In Poland, birch such as downy birch (Betula pubescens) appear popular in use. In the Volga-Ural area, alder forests were preferred, with 71.4% of pairs with found active nests using it, while in Western Siberia they prefer pine forests, 55.9% of the time. Within the Altai-Sayan region, preferred nest trees were birch (50% of the time) and larch trees (31.25% of the time). Acacia arabica and Mangifera indica were reportedly used in Pakistan, and Mitragyna parvifolia in India, and were reportedly sometimes even on agricultural land. In essentially every Russian study, nests were almost invariably in floodplain forests. Nesting sites in the Volga-Ural area averaged  from the nearest forest edge, but were often in the densest part of the forest stands. Even more rarely, nests have been reportedly located on the ground. At times, they may use the nests of other birds, most likely other birds of prey but even a Eurasian magpie (Pica pica) nest was reportedly once used.

Development of young

In Russia, they reportedly seldom lay eggs until May, but sometimes as early as late April, with similar if mildly earlier laying times farther west. The clutch size is typically two though sometimes the nest contains one to three eggs. The eggs are broad ovals that are grayish white in colour and tend to be glossless and often unmarked. However, sometimes they may manifest a few dark brown spots or blotches and sparse grey shell-marks. The incubation stage lasts 42–44 days per most sources, but in southern Belarus, an incubation stage of only 39 days was documented. Incubation begins with the first egg. The male of the pair was once thought to not to take part in incubation (typically, as in many raptors, they primarily have the responsibility of prey deliveries). However, in the aforementioned Belarusian study, the male incubated an average of 57.3 minutes during daylight. In the Altai taiga region, among 6 greater spotted eagle territories, the average brood size was 1.33 nestling per successful nest or 1.0 nestling per occupied nest. Two of the Altai greater spotted eagle territories were on the abandoned territories of eastern imperial eagles. Meanwhile, in the Volga-Ural and Western Siberia areas, the mean brood sizes were 1.24 and 1.42, respectively. The body size between the greater spotted eagle nestlings differs markedly when the second eaglet hatches and the younger usually dies, often via siblicide. Competition often resulting in starvation or intentional killing of the younger chick by its elder sibling is not uncommon in birds of prey, especially the eagles, and is often hypothesized as a kind of insurance process wherein the younger sibling acts an insurance if the elder sibling is somehow killed, otherwise the younger sibling (which is not necessarily in ill health) is possibly expected to die. However, this species raises two fledglings at least somewhat more commonly than the lesser spotted eagle. Out of 50 nests in the Oka Nature Reserve, though, only one pair managed to produce two fledglings in a year. In an experiment in a nest in Poland, a younger sibling was taken out of the nest to save it, with the younger eaglet weighing  against  for the older sibling at the point of extraction. After being taken out of the nest, the younger eaglet was raised with minimal interactions, to avoid imprinting, beyond feeding in captivity by humans. The eaglet shared a cage with an eastern imperial eagle and a lesser spotted eagle both of which were indifferent towards and did not in any way care for or feed the young greater spotted eagle. At the point of fledgling the young eagle was successfully reintroduced to its own parent's nest, fledged and attained independence. The mother greater spotted eagle can be a somewhat tight sitter but can abandon the nest when disturbed by humans, in a Belarusian study for a full day before returning. By late July to early August, the young are fully feathered, soon takes its first flight in not more than 5 days. Fledgling is at 60–67 days, averaging close to 62 days. In Altai-Sayan region, the mean number of fledglings per successful nest could vary from a mean of 1 per nest in Tuva to 1.8 in Khakassia. In Kazakh studies, a mean of 1.38 fledglings were produced in 11 nests. In Western Siberia, a mean of 1.44 fledglings were produced in 66 broods. Further dependence on the parents lasts to 30 days more after fledgling. Before dispersing for good, the young greater spotted eagles may wander locally into the open steppe for a little while. Female greater spotted eagles were found to leave 2–3 days before their young in a study in Poland,. Meanwhile, the male tends to leave leave last, at about 1 week after the female. In the Polish study, adults headed straight for Bosphorus while juveniles were sometimes less direct. Most were gone from Poland by the end of September, juveniles also seen to wander in elsewhere in Poland during autumn before finally migrating.

Hybridization
At one time, it is possible that greater and lesser spotted eagles were largely isolated from each other via different habitat usage, although the ranges may have long since abutted one another. Possibly at the conclusion of the last ice age at some point early in the Holocene permitted forest growth where there were once grassy boundaries, allowing the two species of spotted eagles to expand into each other’s ranges. Hybrids between the species often show a nape patch, absent in pure greater spotted eagles, an intermediate amount of spotting about the wings and a typically larger body size than pure lesser spotted eagles. Despite their intermediate characteristics and larger size than lesser spotteds, the hybridization of the species is thought to be an indication of the abandonment of greater spotted eagle territories and the replacement of them by the more adaptive and populous lesser spotted eagles, as was indicated in an Estonian study. The Estonian study reflected that the number of hybrid greater-lesser spotted eagle pairs was twice as high in the nation than pure greater spotted eagles. The situation was even graver in Lithuania where not a single pure pair of greater spotted eagles could be found any longer by the mid-2000s, with only 2.7% of 161 breeding spotted eagles being greater spotteds, the rest being lesser spotted eagles. Lesser spotted eagles were estimated to number around 1000 breeding pairs in Lithuania, with an estimated 37 or so of these containing one mate that is a greater spotted eagle. Both Polish and Estonian studies reflected a probable high turnover of mates in hybrid pairs, with the Polish data finding about 71% of the males of the pairs being supplemented in subsequent years. Furthermore the Polish data shows that the hybrids are favouring the habitats of lesser spotted eagles farther away from the wetter habitats of the greater spotted eagle and often nearer human development, with a local 50% reduction of pure greater spotted eagle pairs and 30% increase in hybrid pairs. The habitat alterations to the environment by humans are thought in general to be partially beneficial to lesser spotted eagles and normally harmful to greater spotted eagles.

Status and conservation

Despite maintaining a fairly vast breeding range, covering at least 9 million square kilometers, in a band from the Baltic Sea in Europe right across to the Pacific Ocean with minor outpost in the Indian subcontinent, this eagle occurs at extremely low densities. The populations and trends of the species have been considered fairly poorly studied in the past, but a strong declining trend has been detected. More refined subsequent efforts put the number of breeding pairs in the European Union at 810 to 1100 breeding pairs. Furthermore, in the 1990s, it was extrapolated from Indian wintering populations that the more eastern population is surely less than four figures. Birdlife International in the 1990s estimated the Russian population at 2800-3000 pairs. More recently, Birdlife has estimated the global population as no more than 3800-13,200 total mature individuals worldwide. Color-banding recovery studies have determined that of 1370 European band recoveries of spotted eagles, only 3.6% were greater spotted eagles, while hybrid greater x lesser spotted eagles comprised 2.7%, the remaining numbering being all lesser spotted eagles. Greater spotted eagles are considered extripated as a breeding species from Hungary, Romania, Bulgaria, Czech Republic (where they may have never consistently bred) and Slovakia, as well as Israel where they last bred in the 1960s. Meanwhile, the Finland breeding population is also likely almost gone. Steady reduction in Ukraine down to 40-50 pairs by 1985 and a 12-20% overall reduction of the Ukrainian population was estimated, from 1920s to 1990s. The numbers of greater spotted eagles in Estonia declined 14% in the period merely from 2004 to 2010, with declines having been detected for some time there. The number of breeding pairs in Belarus is as many 150-200 pairs (with confirmed counts of somewhat over 100 breeding pairs) and this is considered the most important breeding area known outside of Russia.

Where the total numbers in European Russia were once estimated at around 1000 breeding pairs in the 1960s, it is estimated that there are fewer than 700 pairs left there. The range has shrunk in the Russian Far East, where it once widely found but is now restricted to below the middle Amur, along the Ussuri and south Primorsky although anecdotal information suggests that it is still somewhat common in the whole Western Siberian lowlands from the Ural Mountains to the middle Ob River. In Kazakhstan, there are an estimated 74-97 breeding pairs of the species. Wintering estimates are more scattered and efforts to tabulate numbers in India show they continue to occur quite broadly but in perhaps slightly lowered and more scattered numbers. In Armenia, it is considered one of the two rarest of the nation’s 30 raptor species, along with the eastern imperial eagle. Wintering numbers of greater spotted eagles in the Mediterranean Basin were found to total about 300-400 individuals, with a bit under 34% of these in Israel, just under 32% in Greece, 16% in Turkey, somewhat smaller numbers in Romania and Spain and tiny numbers in Southeastern Europe, Montenegro and France. Around 50 individuals winter in Turkey per other sources. The species appears fairly rarely in Ethiopia and Eretria where they are seen singly and sparsely in most cases. In essentially every nation of its distribution, the greater spotted eagle has a Vulnerable status. As a species, the greater spotted eagle is classified as vulnerable to extinction by the IUCN.

Threats and conservation efforts

The primary threats are habit degradation and habitat loss. Greater spotted eagles appear to be highly sensitive to habitat alterations, especially drainage of wetlands, intensified agricultural practices and abandonment of floodplain management practices. Detrimental wetland management processes have additionally effected the species on their wintering grounds, where in Saudi Arabia at least, the effect has been offset by the greater spotted eagles adapting to man-made bodies of water (unlike in winter, though, there is no evidence that they adapt well to man-made areas during breeding). The amount of usable manmade habitats has shrunk in Thailand with a change to dry season rice field cropping and the creeping presence of urbanization, along with probable rodenticide usage and other poisonings, likely harming numbers of the species able to winter there. Other threats are known to include human disturbance during the mating season, with forestry operations known now to be a major cause of disturbance at the nest site. Furthermore, greater spotted eagles are threatened by mostly inadvertent poisonings and collisions with man-made objects, especially electrical wires. Poisonings were known to be a serious cause of mortality in Shanxi reserve of China where the eagles were seen to hunt down sickly or dying common pheasants (Phasianus colchicus) that had been poisoned and then subsequently dying themselves, this becoming the primary local source of mortality. In the Malay Peninsula, subsequent to a brief increase of the species from the 1960s to the 1980s due to environmental changes favorable to avian scavengers, a crash in numbers down to almost none there was thought to be quite likely due to pesticide and other poison usage. The real trends of greater spotted eagles are sometimes masked by misidentifications. Furthermore, as aforementioned, the species is at threat of hybridization and ultimate supplanting by the lesser spotted eagle as that species’ range creeps farther east. The greater spotted eagle is legally protected in a scattered amount of nations, making conservation efforts difficult. Among the nations where they are legally protected are Belarus, Estonia, France, Greece, Latvia, Poland, Romania, Russia and nominally in Thailand. A working group specifically to address spotted eagles has been established as of the 21st century. The working groups have managed to undertake conservation efforts in Belarus, Estonia and the Ukraine, among the core breeding areas left in Europe for the species and they’ve successfully instituted restrictions of forestry activities near the nest sites during the breeding season. The building of artificial nest platforms did not seem to greatly aid greater spotted eagles in Nizhny Novgorod, unlike other raptors such as the osprey, the white-tailed eagle (Haliaeetus albicilla) and the golden eagle, as only one pair of greater spotteds were recorded to use a platform as a nest and higher survey numbers of greater spotted eagles in that region were likely only due to more extensive surveying. In an exceptional positive note, it was found the European population of greater spotted eagle, as studied via microsatellites, retains quite high genetic diversity, meaning that there is no eminent threat of a genetic bottleneck for the species.

References

External links

 Greater spotted eagle Photographs, text and map at Oiseaux.net
 
 
 
 
 

greater spotted eagle
Birds of Russia
Birds of East Africa
Birds of Central Africa
Birds of North Africa
Birds of prey of Eurasia
greater spotted eagle